The 1976–77 Scottish Premier Division season was won by Celtic, nine points ahead of Rangers. Heart of Midlothian and Kilmarnock were relegated.

Table

Results

Matches 1–18
During matches 1–18 each team plays every other team twice (home and away).

Matches 19–36
During matches 19–36 each team plays every other team twice (home and away).

References
1976–77 Scottish Premier Division – Statto

Scottish Premier Division seasons
1976–77 Scottish Football League
Scot